This article lists important figures and events in Malayan public affairs during the year 1958, together with births and deaths of significant Malayans.

Incumbent political figures

Federal level
Yang di-Pertuan Agong: Tuanku Abdul Rahman of Negeri Sembilan
Raja Permaisuri Agong: Tunku Kurshiah of Negeri Sembilan
Prime Minister: Tunku Abdul Rahman Putra Al-Haj
Deputy Prime Minister: Datuk Abdul Razak

State level
 Sultan of Johor: Sultan Ibrahim
 Sultan of Kedah: 
Sultan Badlishah (until 1958)
Sultan Abdul Halim Muadzam Shah (from 1958)
 Sultan of Kelantan: Sultan Ibrahim
 Raja of Perlis: Tuanku Syed Putra
 Sultan of Perak: Sultan Yusuf Izzuddin Shah
 Sultan of Pahang: Sultan Abu Bakar
 Sultan of Selangor: Sultan Hisamuddin Alam Shah (Deputy Yang di-Pertuan Agong)
 Sultan of Terengganu: Sultan Ismail Nasiruddin Shah
 Yang di-Pertuan Besar of Negeri Sembilan: Tunku Munawir (Regent)
 Yang di-Pertua Negeri (Governor) of Penang: Raja Uda
 Yang di-Pertua Negeri (Governor) of Malacca: Tun Leong Yew Koh

(Source: Malaysian Department of Informations)

Events
 Early 1958 – Malaysian Ceylonese Congress was founded.
 February – Sulaiman Courts, Malaya's first residential flats were opened.
 5–11 March – United Nations Economic Commission for Asia and the Far East Conference was held in Kuala Lumpur.
 May – The Klang Gates Dam, the first water reservoir dam in Klang Valley was opened.
 24 May–1 June – Malaya competed in the 1958 Asian Games in Tokyo, Japan and won three bronze medals, in athletics, weightlifting and tennis.
 1 June – The Royal Malayan Air Force (RMAF) is established.
 18–26 July – Malaya competed in the 1958 British Empire and Commonwealth Games in Cardiff, Wales and won two silver medals, in weightlifting.
 26 August – The Malayan People's Socialist Front (later renamed as the Malayan People's Socialist Party) was formed.
 28 August – National Visual Arts Gallery of Malaysia was established by Prime Minister Tunku Abdul Rahman.
 28 August – The Elections Ordinance 1958 was enacted.
 31 August – The first anniversary of the Federation of Malaya's independence was celebrated.
 6 December – The Indian President Dr. Rajendra Prasad was the first foreign leader to visit Malaya.
 10 December – The 10th anniversary of the Universal Declaration of Human Rights was celebrated.
 Unknown date – Bukit Bintang Boys' Secondary School was founded by Miss Mary Glasgow.
 Unknown date – Melaka Art Gallery was established.
 Unknown date – The Corrosive and Explosive Substances and Offensive Weapons Ordinance 1958 was enacted.

Births
 1 January – Eman Manan – Actor
 6 January – Chef Wan – Celebrity chef
 7 January – Yasmin Ahmad – Film director (died 2009)
 27 January – Accapan – Actor and comedian
 22 March – A. Rahman bin Mokhtar – Politician (died 2013)
 27 May – Yunus Alif – Footballer and coach
 9 July 
 Jacob Joseph, football coach
 Abdul Latiff Ahmad, politician
 10 July – Salleh Said Keruak, politician
 28 July – Amy Search, singer
 21 August – Idris Jala, politician and minister
 2 September – Azlan Man, Menteri Besar of Perlis
 22 November – Tunku Ibrahim Ismail, Sultan of Johor
 30 November – Mohamed Khaled Nordin, Menteri Besar of Johor
 10 December – Ahmad Shabery Cheek, politician and minister
 28 December – Raja Ashman Shah ibni Sultan Azlan Muhibbuddin Shah – Raja Kecil Sulung Perak Darul Ridzuan
 Unknown date – Rosli Khamis (Loloq) – Lyrics writer (died 2008)
 Unknown date – Zaidi Omar – Actor

Deaths
 13 July – Sultan Badlishah of Kedah

See also 
 1958 
 1957 in Malaysia | 1959 in Malaysia
 History of Malaysia

References 

 
Years of the 20th century in Malaysia
Malaya
1950s in Malaya
Malaya